John Bear may refer to:
John Bear (educator), American author and educator
John Bear (snooker player) (1944–2007), Canadian snooker player
John C. Bear (born 1972), Pennsylvania politician
John Bear (pirate), pirate active in the Caribbean 1684–1689
John Bear (politician), member of the Wyoming House of Representatives

See also
John Beare (1820–1914), Canadian farmer and mill owner
John Baer (disambiguation)
John Drew-Bear (born 1955), Venezuelan sailor